The 2018 Ford EcoBoost 400 was a Monster Energy NASCAR Cup Series race that was held on November 18, 2018, at Homestead-Miami Speedway in Homestead, Florida. Contested over 267 laps on the 1.5 mile (2.4 km) oval, it was the 36th and final race of the 2018 Monster Energy NASCAR Cup Series season, and was also the last race for the Ford Fusion, as it will be replaced for the 2019 season by the Mustang GT. This race was the final start for Furniture Row Racing.

Report

Background

Homestead-Miami Speedway is a motor racing track located in Homestead, Florida. The track, which has several configurations, has promoted several series of racing, including NASCAR, the Verizon IndyCar Series, the Grand-Am Rolex Sports Car Series and the Championship Cup Series.

Since 2002, Homestead-Miami Speedway has hosted the final race of the season in all three of NASCAR's series: the Sprint Cup Series, Xfinity Series and Camping World Truck Series. Ford Motor Company sponsors all three of the season-ending races; the races have the names Ford EcoBoost 400, Ford EcoBoost 300 and Ford EcoBoost 200, respectively, and the weekend is marketed as Ford Championship Weekend. The Xfinity Series (then known as the Busch Series) has held its season-ending races at Homestead since 1995.

Championship drivers
Joey Logano was the first of the four drivers to clinch a spot in the Championship 4, winning the first race of the Round of 8 at Martinsville.

Kyle Busch clinched the second spot in the Championship 4 based on points at the Phoenix race when Ricky Stenhouse Jr. crashed out of the race and finished 33rd. Busch had to finish at least 33rd to be locked in on points. He later clinched a playoff berth anyway by winning the race.

Martin Truex Jr. clinched the third spot in the Championship 4 based on points.

Kevin Harvick clinched the final spot based on points after his Texas win was encumbered after a spoiler violation.

Entry list

First practice

Qualifying

Qualifying results

Practice (post-qualifying)

Second practice

Final practice

Race

Note: Joey Logano, Kevin Harvick, Martin Truex Jr., and Kyle Busch were not eligible for stage points in this race because of their participation as the Championship 4 drivers.

Stage Results

Stage 1
Laps: 80

Stage 2
Laps: 80

Final Stage Results

Stage 3
Laps: 107

Race statistics
 Lead changes: 7 among different drivers
 Cautions/Laps: 5 for 26
 Red flags: 0
 Time of race: 3 hours, 0 minutes and 36 seconds
 Average speed:

Media

Television
NBC covered the race on the television side. Rick Allen, Jeff Burton, Steve Letarte and Dale Earnhardt Jr. had the call in the booth for the race. Dave Burns, Parker Kligerman, Marty Snider and Kelli Stavast reported from pit lane during the race. While the race itself aired on NBC, NBCSN aired NBCSN NASCAR Hot Pass, a simultaneous live feed dedicated to each of the Championship drivers, with commentary by Leigh Diffey and Dale Jarrett. Also, three different angles from in-car cameras and a track map tracked the driver's position and changes throughout the field.

Radio
MRN had the radio call for the race, which was simulcast on Sirius XM NASCAR Radio.

Standings after the race

Manufacturers' Championship standings

Note: Only the first 16 positions are included for the driver standings.

References

Ford EcoBoost 400
Ford EcoBoost 400
NASCAR races at Homestead-Miami Speedway
Ford EcoBoost 400